Astigs is an ABS-CBN's weekly youth-oriented program running under the youth anthology series "Star Magic Presents" which started airing from January 12, 2008 to May 10, 2008 The show will feature different stories every six weeks.

Season 1: Astigs in Haay...School Lyf

The initial offering of Astigs, Astigs in Haay...School Lyf, revolves around five outsiders trying to fit in with the in crowd. One sure way to be known is to belong in a school club. But no one wants to accept them so they decide to put up a club of their own which they call "Astig". And their core vision is to accept anyone who dares to be different.

Cast

Season 2: Astigs in Luvin' Lyf
Epi just broke with Janine. To help Epi recover from his heartbreak his friends introduces him to Reema, a hot chick who rides a bike. Reema tells Epi to talk things out with Janine and Epi confronts Jethro about Reema.

Cast
Enchong Dee as Epi
Megan Young as Janine
AJ Perez as Wave
Lauren Young as Sandy
Chris Gutierrez as Clay
Zia Marquez as Trisha/Trish
Angelo Patrimonio as Alvin
Victor Basa as Dean
Valeen Montenegro as Ella
Empress Schuck as Reema
Dino Imperial as Jethro
Martin del Rosario as Blake
Isabelle Abiera as Ice
Jessy Mendiola as Shannon
Alfonso Martinez as Marty
Dianne Medina as Teena

References

External links
 ABS-CBN
 

Philippine teen drama television series
ABS-CBN drama series
2008 Philippine television series debuts
2008 Philippine television series endings
Television series about teenagers